Solar cycle 5 was the fifth solar cycle since 1755, when extensive recording of solar sunspot activity began. The solar cycle lasted 12.3 years, beginning in April 1798 and ending in August 1810 (thus falling within the Dalton Minimum).  The maximum smoothed sunspot number observed during the solar cycle was 82.0, in February 1805 (the second-lowest of any cycle to date, behind solar cycle 6, as a result of being part of the Dalton Minimum), and the starting minimum was 5.3.

See also
List of solar cycles

References

Solar cycles